Eric Dwayne Hill (born November 14, 1966) is a former professional American football linebacker who played for eleven seasons in the National Football League (NFL), nine of them with the Phoenix/Arizona Cardinals. He played in 160 games in his professional career, starting in 151 of them. He attended Louisiana State University, where he played college football for the LSU Tigers football team. Hill was born in Blytheville, Arkansas and attended Ball High School in Galveston, Texas. Eric captained the Arizona Cardinals 7 out of his 9 years. Pro Bowl alternate 3 years, All Pro 94,95 and also All Madden Team in 1995.

References

1966 births
Living people
People from Blytheville, Arkansas
American football linebackers
LSU Tigers football players
Phoenix Cardinals players
Arizona Cardinals players
St. Louis Rams players
San Diego Chargers players
Players of American football from Arkansas